Diyab Haroon Taha (born 15 January 2001) is a Qatari footballer who plays as right back for Al-Khor.

Career
Diyab started his career with Al-Duhail and is a product of the Al-Duhail's youth system. On 31 January 2021, he joined Al-Khor.

References

External links 
 

Qatari footballers
Qatar under-20 international footballers
2001 births
Living people
Aspire Academy (Qatar) players
Al-Duhail SC players
Al-Khor SC players
Qatar Stars League players
Association football fullbacks
Qatar youth international footballers